The Health Information National Trends Survey (HINTS) is a cross-sectional, nationally representative survey of American adults sponsored by the National Cancer Institute. HINTS provides publicly available data on American adults' knowledge of, attitudes toward, and behaviors related to cancer prevention, control and communication. Researchers use the data to identify trends in health communication, including how people find cancer information, which sources they use, their feelings about the search process, and how they perceive cancer overall.

For example, HINTS data users have examined how adults 18 years and older use different communication channels (e.g., the Internet) to obtain vital health information for themselves and their loved ones. They've also analyzed the experiences people have when they search for cancer information. Program planners can use the data to overcome barriers to health-information access and to obtain data to help them create more effective communication strategies. Social scientists can use the data to refine theories of health communication and to recommend methods to reduce the burden of cancer.

As a national-level surveillance vehicle for cancer and health communication, HINTS can make valuable contributions to the larger cyberinfrastructure devoted to health and may potentially be leveraged with other national-level surveys (e.g., The Centers for Disease Control and Prevention's Behavioral Risk Factors Surveillance Survey and National Health Interview Survey) to gauge the effects of policy changes on population health.

HINTS Surveys

HINTS 1 (2003)
The first HINTS data were collected between October 2002 and April 2003 via a Random Digit Dial (RDD) telephone survey using a Computer Assisted Telephone Interview (CATI) format to accommodate complex skip-patterns based on respondent's answers. Data were collected from 6,369 respondents. The survey instruments are available in English and Spanish.

HINTS 2 (2005)
HINTS 2 data were collected from February 2005 through August 2005. HINTS 2005 also used RDD/CATI and identical data collection procedures. Data were collected from 5,586 respondents.

HINTS 3 (2008)
HINTS 3 data were collected from January 2008 through May 2008. The sample design for HINTS 2008 consisted of two samples with each sample selected from a separate sample frame. One sample used the same RDD/CATI methodology as prior surveys. Survey administration averaged 30 minutes per respondent. Data were collected from 4,092 respondents.

The second sample was selected from United States Postal Service address administrative records. After the CATI instrument was modified to produce a printed questionnaire, the survey and a cover letter were sent to the address sample. All adults at each sampled address were asked to return the completed questionnaire in a postage-paid envelope. Data were collected from 3,582 respondents. Data from both surveys became available for public use in February 2009 along with a final report.

The 2008 survey added questions about social media, personal health records, health services utilization, and patient provider communication.

HINTS Puerto Rico (2009)
HINTS researchers expanded to Puerto Rico in 2009. The University of Puerto Rico Comprehensive Cancer Center and the Puerto Rico Behavioral Risk Factors Surveillance System collaborated with the National Cancer Institute on the project. A total of 639 interviews were conducted (603 complete and 36 partially complete). Data and documentation as well as instructions on how to combine the data set with HINTS 2007 is available on the HINTS website.

HINTS 4, Cycle 1 (2011)
Data for cycle 1 were collected from October 2011 through February 2012. The sample design consisted of a single-mode mail survey, with two methods of respondent selection: the All Adult method and the Next Birthday method. The sampling consisted of a two-stage stratified sample of addresses used by Marketing Systems Group (MSG). In the All Adult method, two questionnaires were sent with each mailing, where all adults residing in a sampled household were asked to complete the questionnaire. In the next birthday method, one questionnaire was sent with each mailing so that the adult who would have the next birthday in the sampled household was asked to complete the questionnaire. Data were collected from 3,959 respondents. The methodology report, complete data set and the survey instruments are available on the HINTS website.

HINTS 4, Cycle 2 (2012)
Data for cycle 2 were collected from October 2012 through January 2013. The sample design consisted of a single-mode mail survey, using the Next Birthday method for respondent selection. It included two stages. In the first stage, a stratified sample of addresses was selected from a file of residential addresses. In the second-stage, one adult was selected within each sampled household. The sampling frame consisted of a database of addresses used by Marketing Systems Group (MSG) to provide random samples of addresses. Complete data were collected from 3,630 respondents. The methodology report, complete data set and the survey instruments are available on the HINTS website.

HINTS 4, Cycle 3 (2013)
Cycle 3 data were collected from September 2013 through December 2013. Like cycle 2, the sample design consisted of a single-mode mail survey that used the Next Birthday method for respondent selection. The sample design for this survey consisted of two-stages. In the first stage, a stratified sample of addresses was selected from a file of residential addresses. In the second-stage, one adult was selected within each sampled household. The sampling frame consisted of a database of addresses used by Marketing Systems Group (MSG) to provide random samples of addresses. Complete data were collected from 3,185 respondents. The methodology report, complete data set and the survey instruments are available on the HINTS website.

HINTS 4, Cycle 4 (2014)
Data were collected from August through November, 2014. The sample design for this cycle consisted of a single-mode mail survey, using the Next Birthday method for respondent selection. The sample design consisted of two-stages. In the first stage, a stratified sample of addresses was selected from a file of residential addresses. In the second-stage, one adult was selected within each sampled household. The sampling frame consisted of a database of addresses used by Marketing Systems Group (MSG) to provide random samples of addresses. Complete data were collected from 3,677 respondents. The methodology report, complete data set and the survey instruments are available on the HINTS website.

HINTS knowledge products 
Three categories of HINTS knowledge products are available:  books/reports, HINTS briefs, and overview materials.

Books and reports include a special issue devoted to HINTS research as well as reports that summarize the results of HINTS 2003 and 2005 and that explain analytic strategies for evaluating trends between iterations of the survey.

HINTS Briefs provide two page high-level summaries of HINTS research and are usually based on a HINTS study that appears in the peer-reviewed literature.  The briefs cover several topics, including sun safety, human papillomavirus, and cancer information seeking behaviors.

Finally, the HINTS overview materials include a HINTS brochure and a HINTS fact sheet. These overview materials can be useful to researchers presenting HINTS data at conferences when explaining their methodological approach.

References

External links
http://hints.cancer.gov/
http://hints.cancer.gov/docs/HINTS_2003_final_report.pdf
http://hints.cancer.gov/docs/HINTS_2005_Final_Report.pdf

Health in the United States
Health surveys
Public health research